The following is a partial list of ships built at the Boston Navy Yard, also called the Charlestown Navy Yard and Boston Naval Shipyard. The year shown is the launch year.

 1814:  (90-gun ship of the line) War of 1812; Mexican–American War
 1825:  (18-gun sloop of war) Mexican–American War
 1827:  (20-gun sloop of war) Mexican–American War
 1827:  (24-gun sloop of war) Mexican–American War
 1837:  (22-gun sloop of war) Mexican–American War; American Civil War
 1839:  (16-gun sloop of war) American Civil War
 1842:  (50-gun frigate) Mexican–American War; Battle of Hampton Roads
 1844:  (22-gun sloop of war) Perry Expedition
 1848:  (74-gun ship of the line) American Civil War
 1858:  (22-gun sloop of war) Battle of Forts Jackson and St. Philip; Battle of Mobile Bay
 1859:  (5-gun sloop of war) American Civil War
 1861:  (10-gun sloop of war) Peninsula Campaign; Bahia incident
 1861:  (11-gun sloop of war) Sinking of USS Housatonic
 1861:  (side-wheel steam gunboat) Peninsula Campaign; First Battle of Fort Fisher; Second Battle of Fort Fisher
 1862:  (6-gun sloop of war) American Civil War
 1862:  (side-wheel steam gunboat) American Civil War
 1862:  (side-wheel steam gunboat) American Civil War
 1863:  (monitor) First Battle of Fort Fisher; Second Battle of Fort Fisher
 1863:  (gunboat) First Battle of Fort Fisher; Second Battle of Fort Fisher
 1863:  (gunboat) American Civil War
 1863:  (side-wheel steam gunboat)
 1864:  (frigate)
 1865:  (sloop of war)
 1866:  (sloop of war)
 1867:  (sloop of war)
 1868:  (sloop of war) Battle of Ganghwa
 1876:  (sloop of war) 1889 Apia cyclone
 1916:  (Combat stores ship) World War I; World War II
 1919:  (Fleet oiler) World War II
 1920:  (Fleet oiler) World War II
 1921:  (Fleet oiler) World War II
 2 of 8 s
 1934:   Attack on Pearl Harbor; Battle of Savo Island; Battle of the Philippine Sea; Battle of Leyte Gulf
 1935:   Attack on Pearl Harbor; Battle of the Coral Sea; Battle of Midway; Battle of the Komandorski Islands; Battle of the Philippine Sea
 2 of 18 s
 1935:   Attack on Pearl Harbor; Battle of the Philippine Sea
 1935:   Attack on Pearl Harbor; Battle of Midway; Battle of the Santa Cruz Islands; Operation Crossroads
 2 of 8 s
 1936:   Attack on Pearl Harbor
 1936:   Attack on Pearl Harbor; Battle of Savo Island; Battle of Kolombangara; Battle off Cape Engaño; Operation Crossroads
 2 of 10 s
 1938:   Naval Battle of Casablanca; Operation Crossroads
 1938:   Allied invasion of Sicily; Invasion of Salerno; Operation Crossroads
 2 of 12 s
 1939:   Guadalcanal Campaign
 1939:   Naval Battle of Guadalcanal
 2 of 30 s
 1939:   Battle of the Atlantic; Operation Dragoon
 1939:   Battle of the Atlantic
 10 of 66 s
 1940:   Doolittle Raid; Battle of Midway; Naval Battle of Guadalcanal; Battle of Kolombangara
 1940:   Doolittle Raid
 1940:   Naval Battle of Casablanca
 1940:   invasion of Salerno; Battle for Leyte Gulf
 1941:   Operation Torch; Normandy invasion; Operation Dragoon; Battle of Okinawa
 1941:   Operation Torch; Normandy invasion; Operation Dragoon
 1941:   Operation Torch; Allied invasion of Sicily
 1941:   Operation Torch; Allied invasion of Sicily; Allied invasion of Italy
 1941:   Operation Torch; Allied invasion of Sicily
 1941:   Allied invasion of Sicily
 14 of 175 s
 1942:   Battle of the Philippine Sea; Battle of Iwo Jima; Battle of Okinawa
 1942:   Battle of Iwo Jima; Battle of Okinawa
 1942:   Battle of the Philippine Sea; Battle of Iwo Jima; Battle of Okinawa
 1942:   Battle of the Philippine Sea; Battle of Iwo Jima; Battle of Okinawa
 1942:   Battle of Surigao Strait; Battle of Iwo Jima; Battle of Okinawa
 1942:   Battle of the Philippine Sea; Battle for Leyte Gulf
 1942:   Battle of the Philippine Sea; Battle for Leyte Gulf
 1942:   Philippines campaign; Battle of Iwo Jima; Battle of Okinawa
 1943:   Philippines campaign; Battle of Iwo Jima; Battle of Okinawa
 1943:   Philippines campaign
 1943:   Battle of Surigao Strait; Battle of Iwo Jima; Battle of Okinawa
 1943:   Battle of Leyte; Battle of Iwo Jima; Battle of Okinawa
 1943:   Battle of Surigao Strait; Battle of Iwo Jima; Battle of Okinawa
 1943:   Battle of Surigao Strait; Battle of Iwo Jima; Battle of Okinawa

 21 of 65  destroyer escorts
 1942:   Battle of the Atlantic
 1942:   Battle of the Atlantic
 1943:   shared credit for sinking ; Battle of Okinawa
 1943:   Pacific Theater of Operations
 1943:   Battle of Okinawa
 1943:   Battle of Okinawa
 1943:   Battle of Okinawa
 1943:   Battle of Okinawa
 1943:   Battle of the Atlantic
 1943:   Battle of the Atlantic
 1943:   shared credit for sinking 
 1943:   Pacific Theater of Operations
 1943:   Pacific Theater of Operations
 1943:   Pacific Theater of Operations
 1943:   Pacific Theater of Operations
 1943:   Pacific Theater of Operations
 1943:   Battle of Okinawa
 1943:   Battle of the Atlantic
 1943:   Battle of the Atlantic
 1943:   Battle of the Atlantic
 1943:   Battle of the Atlantic

 31 of 32 Evarts-class destroyer escorts converted to  frigates
 1942: HMS   shared credit for sinking U-757, U-1279, U-989 & U-1278
 1942: HMS   shared credit for sinking U-648, U-600 & U-636
 1942: HMS   Battle of the Atlantic
 1942: HMS   shared credit for sinking U-648 & U-600
 1943: HMS   shared credit for sinking U-1063
 1943: HMS   Battle of the Atlantic
 1943: HMS   shared credit for sinking U-988 & U-214
 1943: HMS   Normandy Invasion
 1943: HMS   shared credit for sinking U-988
 1943: HMS   shared credit for sinking U-538
 1943: HMS   shared credit for sinking U-358
 1943: HMS   shared credit for sinking U-91 & U-358
 1943: HMS   Battle of the Atlantic
 1943: HMS   Battle of the Atlantic
 1943: HMS   Battle of the Atlantic
 1943: HMS   Battle of the Atlantic
 1943: HMS   shared credit for sinking U-91 & U-358
 1943: HMS   shared credit for sinking U-1172 & U-285
 1943: HMS   Battle of the Atlantic
 1943: HMS   Normandy Invasion
 1943: HMS   Normandy Invasion
 1943: HMS   shared credit for sinking U-445
 1943: HMS   Battle of the Atlantic
 1943: HMS   Battle of the Atlantic
 1943: HMS   Battle of the Atlantic
 1943: HMS   Battle of the Atlantic
 1943: HMS   Battle of the Atlantic
 1943: HMS   shared credit for sinking U-1051
 1943: HMS   Battle of the Atlantic
 1943: HMS   Battle of the Atlantic
 1943: HMS   Battle of the Atlantic

 10 of 83  destroyer escorts
 1943:   rescued crew of the SS Andrea Doria
 1943:  
 1943:   Battle for Leyte Gulf; Battle of Okinawa
 1943:   Pacific Theater of Operations; Korean War
 1943:   Pacific Theater of Operations
 1943:   Pacific Theater of Operations
 1943:  
 1943:  
 1943:  
 1943:  

 4 of 29  submarines
 1944:  
 1944:  
 1944:  
 1944:  

 4 of 17  dock landing ships
 1945:   Mercury-Redstone 2 recovery
 1945:  
 1945:   Korean War; Vietnam War
 1945:   Korean War; Vietnam War

 APD conversions

See also
 List of United States Navy ships

References

Boston Harbor
Boston National Historical Park
Boston Navy Yard